Jyotipal Mahathero was a Bangladeshi Buddhist monk. He was the 10th Sangharaja (supreme patriarch) of Buddhists in Bangladesh.

Early life 
Mahathero was born on 5 January 1914 in Kemtali, Laksam Upazila, Comilla District. His father's name was Chandramoni Singh and his mother's name was Draupadi Bala Singh.

Career 
Mahathero was initiated into Shramanya Dharma in 1933 at the age of 15. He became a monk in 1937. He acquired proficient knowledge of Pali language, literature, etc. at Pahartali Mahamuni Pali College, Calcutta and Nalanda Vidya Bhavana. He was proficient in Bengali, Hindi, Pali, English and Sanskrit languages.

Mahathero is the founder of many charitable organizations, such as Boys 'High School in 1991, Chittagong University Peace Pagoda in 1982, Girls' High School (now College), Orphanage, etc.

Mahathero was granted the title of World Citizen by the United Nations in 1995. He received the title of Epitome Master from Nalanda Vidya Bhavana. He was the Sangharaja, the highest religious guru of Bangladeshi Buddhists. He is the 10th religious guru of Buddhists in Bangladesh. He was awarded the title of 'Aggamhadharmjoti Kadhwaj' by the Government of Myanmar. His temple is named after him 'Sangharaj Jyoti: Pal Mahath's Buddhist Mahavihara Complex.

Death and legacy 
Mahathero died on 12 April 2002, at the age of 92. He was buried with full state honors for his contribution to the Bangladesh Liberation war. He received the Ekushey Padak in 2010 and the Independence Day Award (posthumously) in 2011.

References 

People from Comilla District
2002 deaths
1914 births
Recipients of the Independence Day Award
Recipients of the Ekushey Padak
Bangladeshi Buddhist monks
Buddhist writers
Bengali writers
20th-century Buddhist monks